In mathematics, an Erdélyi–Kober operator is a fractional integration operation introduced by  and .

The Erdélyi–Kober fractional integral is given by 

which generalizes the Riemann fractional integral and the Weyl integral.

References

 

 

Fractional calculus